Lootmaar is a 1980 Hindi mystery film produced and directed by Dev Anand. The film stars Dev Anand, Tina Munim, Mehmood, Nirupa Roy, Prem Chopra, Ranjeet, Shakti Kapoor, Kader Khan, Amjad Khan, Simple Kapadia, Shreeram Lagoo and Rakhee Gulzar in a Guest appearance. The film's music was composed by Rajesh Roshan.

Plot
Indian Air Force pilot Bhagat lives with his wife, Raksha and a young son. While going to the bank one day, the family find that the bank is being held up. The bank-robbers panic at the arrival of the police, and fire randomly, killing Raksha instantly. Bhagat witnesses this horrific spectacle and is unable to do anything to save his wife. The robbers were masked, but one of them had a tear in his shoe and another was wearing a locket, very similar to the one worn by his wife. Bhagat's inquiries take him to the northernmost hilly regions of India, where he must confront the past, as well as seek out the elusive killers and bring them to justice, not knowing that in so doing he will be endangering the life of his son.

Cast
 Dev Anand as Wing Commander Bhagat / Jim Darcy
 Tina Munim as Neela 
 Raakhee Gulzar as Raksha (Guest appearance)
 Mehmood
 Nirupa Roy as Satyavati
 Prem Chopra as Damodar
 Ranjeet as Peter
 Shakti Kapoor
 Kader Khan
 Amjad Khan as Vikram
 Simple Kapadia as Rani
 Shreeram Lagoo as Seth Ramniklal
 Om Shivpuri as Mr. Bhagat
 Sudhir Dalvi as Pandit
 Ram Mohan as Police Inspector
 Sharat Saxena as Police Inspector
 Kalpana Iyer as Dancer

Soundtrack
The film's soundtrack was composed by Rajesh Roshan and the lyrics were penned by Amit Khanna.

 "Main Aur Tu Kar Le Dosti" – Lata Mangeshkar
 "Paas Ho Tum Magar Karib Nahi" – Lata Mangeshkar
 "Piya Hum Saat Mulk Ka Pani" – Kishore Kumar
 "Aaj Ka Din" – Lata Mangeshkar, Kishore Kumar
 "Piya Hum" – Kishore Kumar, Mehmood
 "Jab Chaye Mera Jadoo" – Asha Bhosle
 "Hans Tu Hardam Khushiya Ya Gum" – Kishore Kumar, Varsha Bhosle, Shivangi Kolhapure
 "Hans Tu Hardam" – Lata Mangeshkar

Reception
One reviewer said of the film, "Alas, the story simply does not reach the same heights as the casting. The music, too, is utterly disposable, with perhaps one decent song in the bunch."

References

External links 
 

1980 films
1980s Hindi-language films
Films directed by Dev Anand
Films scored by Rajesh Roshan
Indian mystery films